Sean Leland Sebastian Gullette (born June 4, 1968) is an American film director, writer, screenwriter, actor, and producer.

Personal life
Gullette was born in Boston, Massachusetts, the son of Margaret Morganroth Gullette a cultural critic and writer, and David George Gullette, a professor of English. He attended public schools and Harvard, where he acted in theater and films and directed plays.

Gullette lives between New York City and Tangier, Morocco, and in addition to his film work is the founder of the 212 Society, a US non-profit which supports cultural and educational projects in Morocco, including the Cinémathèque de Tanger and Darna. The 212 Society takes its name from the 212 telephone codes of its home city and adoptive country.

Gullette and artist Yto Barrada are married and have two daughters, Vega Violet Alia and Tamo Jasmin Ada.

Acting
His professional work in film began in 1998, when he co-wrote and played the lead role in the award-winning Pi, directed by longtime collaborator Darren Aronofsky. He has since played principal and supporting roles in some twenty films including Brad Anderson's Happy Accidents (with Vincent D'Onofrio and Marisa Tomei) and Darren Aronofsky's Requiem for a Dream (with Jennifer Connelly), the German film Toskana Karrussel (with Susanna Lothar) and as a guest actor on network TV dramas. His occasional theater work has included the lead in the New York premiere of Susan Sandler's If I Were a Train.

In 2010 he played principal roles in Blue Ridge, directed by Vincent Sweeney, and Die zwei Leben des Daniel Shore, with Nikolai Kinski and Morjana Alaoui, directed by Michael Dreher.

In 2015 he played supporting roles in the film Zanj Revolution, by Tariq Teguia and in 2013 Rock the Casbah by Laila Marrakshi.

Gullette performs spoken word pieces on the songs "Song of Alice" from Israeli-French singer Keren Ann's fourth album, Nolita on Blue Note/Capitol/EMI Records and on Northern Irish DJ and musician David Holmes's album Bow Down to the Exit Sign.

Screenwriting 
His feature film screenwriting projects have included Trinity, Conviction, Monopolis and Kilroy. He wrote and is a producer of Thanksgiving, starring Yolonda Ross, James Urbaniak and Seymour Cassel. He wrote "New York Stories" for Donna Karan's DKNY, and directed the "Von Hummer the 1st" series of promotional spots for VH1, starring James Urbaniak. He produced Nicole Zaray's gender-inverted short film Joe's Day, featuring Deborah Harry. He has also consulted on screenplays for Warner Bros., Paramount, and independent productions.  IMDB reports Gullette as the screenwriter of the upcoming Olivier Megaton film Land of the Living.

Film directing 

Gullette is slated to direct Upland, adapted from the novel Nip the Buds, Shoot the Kids by Nobel Prize–winning Japanese author Kenzaburō Ōe, for an upcoming international co-production. Attached cast include Forrest Goodluck and Paul Sparks with Lisa Wolofsky and Pierre Even as lead producers.

In 2019, Gullette directed two episodes of the ABC Television series 1969. Gullette wrote that "Was quite an adventure to direct this hour for ABC TV, which aired in the spring and is now streaming. Thanks to EP Jeanmarie Condon, my segment producers Jesse Rosen and Jackie Filer, senior producer Erica Salit, editors Doug Quade and Alessandro Barnett and the team at Lincoln Square Productions. Despite the title, everyone signed on to resist the grotesque Manson Industry and instead listen closely to the stories of two fascinating — and very different — women who joined the group. Both Dianne Lake and Lynette "Squeaky" Fromme sat for powerful, revealing interviews. Our re-reading of the Manson myth is also carried by Peter Fonda, rock author Lizzy Goodman, VIBE editor Desiree Thompson, Woodstock founder Michael Lang, John Fogerty of Creedence, and Tariq Trotter of The Roots."

In 2014, Gullette's first feature film, Traitors, starring Chaimae Ben Acha, Soufia Issami, Mourade Zeguindi, Driss Roukhe and Saleh Bensaleh was released internationally. The film was shot on locations in Tangier, Morocco and the hashish producing Rif mountains. It made its world premiere at the 2013 Venice Film Festival , and screened in competition at the Stockholm Film Festival and at the Marrakech International Film Festival, the Dubai Film Festival, and the Tribeca Film Festival. The film was distributed by Rezo Films, Paris and in the US by Film Movement. Traitors received positive reviews from critics and has a "Fresh" rating of 88% on Rotten Tomatoes, with an average score of 7.1/10.

Gullette was announced at the Cannes Film Festival as the writer-director of Tangier, a film in-development set to star Kristin Scott Thomas and Jeremy Irons. Tangier will be produced by Darren Aronofsky's Protozoa Pictures.

Gullette produced The 8 with Sarah Riggs and Blaire Dessent; the film was selected for the 2010 Berlin Film Festival. He directed several short films from his own scripts. He produced False Start by Yto Barrada which premiered at the Toronto Film Festival and went on to win a Tiger Award at the 2016 Rotterdam Film Festival and Tree Identification for Beginners also by Barrada which premiered at Rotterdam 2018.

Other writing
Gullette's essays, journalism and fiction have been published in magazines including The Face, Spy, Slate, Bidoun, Brill's Content, Gear, Entertainment Weekly, Nejma, and KGB magazine (which he founded as editor and publisher in 1991.) His essay "Mile High" appears in the NYU Press' book 110 Stories: New York Writes After September 11, and his essay "Notes" appears in the Springer-Verlag anthology Art, Technology, and Cinema. Gullette has ghostwritten for visual artists, and edited texts for the walls and publications of MoMA, the Whitney Biennial, the Tate Modern, and the Centre Pompidou, Paris.

Filmography

Awards and nominations 

Rotterdam International Film Festival
Nominated, Tiger Award
2014

Cyprus Film Days International Festival
Nominated, Glocal Images
Best Film Award for Traitors (2013)

Ft. Lauderdale International Film Festival
Won, Spirit of the Independent Award
Feature Film for Traitors (2013)

Gijón International Film Festival
Won, "Rellumes" Prize
2014

Philadelphia Independent Film Festival, US
Nominated, Best Feature Film
2013

Bratislava International Film Festival
Nominated, Grand Prix
2013

Marrakech International Film Festival
Nominated, Best Director
Nominated, Golden Star
Best Feature Film for Traitors (2013)
2013

Stockholm Film Festival
Nominated, Bronze Horse
Best Film for Traitors (2013)
2013

Venice Film Festival
Nominated, Fedeora Award
Best Film (Venice Days) for Traitors (2013)
Won, Lina Mangiacapre Award - Special Mention
1999

Online Film & Television Association
Nominated, OFTA Film Award
Best Breakthrough Performance: Male for Pi (1998)
Nominated, OFTA Film Award
Best Sci-Fi/Fantasy/Horror Actor for Pi (1998)

References

External links
 
 IndieWire - An Interview with Darren Aronofsky and Sean Gullette of ‘Pi
 Variety - ‘Pi’ Star Sean Gullette Talks About Making ‘Traitors’ in Morocco and His Sophomore Project
 Hollywood Reporter - ‘Traitors: Venice Review
 Filmmaker Magazine - 5 Questions for Traitors Director Sean Gullette
 PopOptiq - Tribeca 2014: Interview with ‘Traitors’ director Sean Gullette
 TRAITORS - Official U.S. Trailer
 Traitors Reviews - Rotten Tomatoes
 Hollywood Reporter - 'Colombiana' Director Takes on 'Land of the Living'
 The Playlist - Details On Sean Gullette’s ‘Tangier’; Kristen Scott Thomas, Jeremy Irons & Tony Shalhoub Joining Cast
 The New York Times - NEWLY RELEASED

1968 births
Male actors from Boston
American male film actors
Harvard University alumni
Living people
American expatriates in Morocco
American essayists
American male screenwriters
Writers from Boston
Film producers from Massachusetts
20th-century American male actors
21st-century American male actors
American male essayists
Screenwriters from Massachusetts